William Winston Greenidge (born 15 May 2002) is an English professional footballer who plays for Colchester United, as a right back.

Career
After playing for West Ham United, where he won the Dylan Tombides Award, Greenidge signed for Colchester United in January 2023 on a two-and-a-half year contract.

References

2002 births
Living people
English footballers
Footballers from the London Borough of Redbridge
West Ham United F.C. players
Colchester United F.C. players
English Football League players
Association football fullbacks